Randy Porter (born July 6, 1964) is a retired American stock car racing driver. Porter competed 73 NASCAR Busch Series races between 1986 and 1998, achieving 3 top ten finishes and 1 pole position.  Porter also competed in two NASCAR Cup Series events in 1992 and one NASCAR Gander RV & Outdoors Truck Series event in 1996.

Motorsports career results

NASCAR
(key) (Bold – Pole position awarded by qualifying time. Italics – Pole position earned by points standings or practice time. * – Most laps led.)

Winston Cup Series

Busch Series

Craftsman Truck Series

References

External links
 

Racing drivers from South Carolina
NASCAR drivers
Living people
1964 births